Topock School District 12 is a public school district based in Mohave County, Arizona.

External links
 

School districts in Mohave County, Arizona